Ioulia Makka (born 10 December 1983) is a Greek chess player who holds the FIDE title of Woman International Master (WIM, 2002). She is a Greek Women's Chess Championship winner (2018).

Biography
Ioulia Makka twice in row won the Greek Junior Chess Championship in the U20 Girls Age Group (2002, 2003). In 2003, in Nakhchivan she won silver medal in World Girls U-20 Championship.

She won four bronze medals in Greek Women's Chess Championships (2001, 2004, 2005, 2017), but in 2018 she won Greek Women's Chess Championship.

Makka played for Greece twice in the European Team Chess Championships (2007, 2017).

In 2002, she awarded the FIDE Woman International Master (WIM) title. In 2016, she became an FIDE Trainer.

References

External links
 
 
 

1983 births
Living people
Greek female chess players
Chess Woman International Masters